The Glory Tower is a residential skyscraper located in Ren-ai District, Keelung, Taiwan. The building was designed by Taiwanese architect Chu-Yuan Lee and was completed in 2007 and houses 271 apartment units. As of December 2020, it is the second tallest building in Keelung, after Lih-Rong An Imperial Crown Building.

See also 
 List of tallest buildings in Taiwan
 Lih-Rong An Imperial Crown Building

References

2007 establishments in Taiwan
Residential skyscrapers in Taiwan
Apartment buildings in Taiwan
Residential buildings completed in 2007
Skyscrapers in Keelung